Allohahella marinimesophila is a Gram-negative, non-endospore-forming and strictly aerobic bacterium from the genus of Allohahella which has been isolated from seawater from the Yellow Sea.

References

External links
Type strain of Allohahella marinimesophila at BacDive -  the Bacterial Diversity Metadatabase

Oceanospirillales
Bacteria described in 2016